Community governance consist of a system of laws, norms, rules, policies and practices mentioned in the constitution or charter that dictate the procedure to manage and oversee the affairs of any international body, line & staff agency, attached body, constitutional body, statutory body, regulatory body, autonomous body, 
public sector undertaking and cooperative society

Community governance is an important subject included in the training module of all of the  international civil services cadres, international defence services cadres, national civil services cadres, national defence services cadres and 
provincial civil services or sub-national civil services cadres.

Community governance includes principles of transparency, accountability and security. Poor community governance, at best leads to high out of pocket expenditure, erosion of trust in the system, reduced service utilisation and poor economic growth.

Community governance essentially involves balancing the interests of government leaders, government officers, government employees, tax payers, consumers   and the citizens.

Community governance as a subject of study shall also additionally include these subsets -

Subset I :- Citizen-Centric-Governance

1. Governance as a process

2. Governance Analytical Framework

3. Ethical Governance

4. Blockchain governance

5. Participatory governance

6. Multilevel Governance

7. Meta Governance

8. Collaborative Governance 

Subset II :- Public Governance

1. Global Governance

2. National Governance

3. Provincial Governance or Sub-National Governance

4. Local Governance

Subset III :- Information Governance

Subset IV :- Digital Governance

1. Electronic Governance

2. Internet Governance

Subset V :- Organisational Governance

1. Governance of Constitutional Body

2. Governance of Regulatory Body

3. Governance of Statutory Body

4. Governance of Line and Staff Agency 

5. Governance of Attached Body

6. Governance of Public Sector Undertaking

7. Governance of Cooperative Society

Subset VI :- Developmental Governance

1. Health Governance

2. Sustenance Governance

3. Human Resources Development Governance 

4. Infrastructure Governance

Subset VII :- Ecosystem Governance

1. Environmental Governance

2. Land Governance

3. Landscape Governance

4. Water Governance

5. Energy Governance

Subset VIII :- Security Governance

1. Internal Security Governance

2. External Security Governance

Any other subsets to be included (if any)

References

Governance